Samantha Harvey (born 30 May 1993) is an English pop singer currently signed to Virgin EMI Records in the UK and Capitol Records in the US. She initially gained a following by posting covers of popular songs on her YouTube channel. Her independently released 2017 single, "Forgive Forget", peaked at number 48 on the UK Singles Chart. She released her first major label single, "Please", in February 2018. She followed that with her major label debut EP, also titled Please, in March 2018.

Early life and education 
Harvey was born in Harleston. She attended Chilton Community Primary School and Stowmarket High School. At age 16, she joined Oskar Foxtrot Productions where she acted and sang in plays. She also studied performing arts at Suffolk New College. While studying, she set up a house-cleaning business in the Suffolk area. In 2014, she began recording and posting covers onto her YouTube channel. Her first cover was of Sam Smith's "Lay Me Down". Samantha then sang this song for her one million subscriber celebration.

Career 
While still working as a house cleaner, Harvey began building a following on her YouTube channel by posting covers of songs by artists like, Adele, Celine Dion, Ed Sheeran, Little Mix, Selena Gomez, Birdy, and numerous others. By April 2016, she was nearing 1 million likes on her Facebook account. She released her first original single, "Wonderland", in September 2016. In November 2016, she appeared on Good Morning Britain singing the weather report.

By April 2017, her YouTube channel had 400,000 subscribers and that number increased to 600,000 by June. In July, her independently released single, "Forgive Forget", reached number 4 on the iTunes chart and number 48 on the UK Singles Chart. Around that time, she quit her cleaning business to focus exclusively on music. In October 2017, she was signed to Virgin EMI Records and Capitol Records.

Harvey released her debut major label single, "Please", in February 2018, and, as of March 2018, it has peaked at number 67 on the UK Singles Chart. She has also continued releasing covers, including one of Shania Twain's "From This Moment On" and Dua Lipa's "IDGAF" in February 2018. In March 2018, Harvey released her debut EP, Please, through Virgin EMI. Later that year, German singer and songwriter, Nico Santos, collaborated with Harvey on a revised version of his single, "Rooftop". In July 2018, she was featured on the Alex Adair and Delayers track, "Dominos". She also appeared in the song's accompanying music video.

Later in 2018, Harvey embarked on a headlining tour throughout the UK and Ireland called the "Between Us Tour". In November 2019, she released a new single entitled "Get To Know You". On 1 July 2022, she released single "Heartbreak Hangover".

Discography

EPs

Singles

References

External links 
Official website

1993 births
Living people
Virgin Records artists
Capitol Records artists
English women singers
English pop singers
People from South Norfolk (district)